Pterospermum is a genus of flowering plants in the mallow family Malvaceae. Its species are tropical trees that range from southern China across tropical Asia.

Traditionally included in the family Sterculiaceae, it is included in the expanded Malvaceae in the APG and most subsequent systematics. Pterospermum is based on two Greek words, "Pteron" and "Sperma," meaning "winged seed."

Some species are grown ornamentally while others are valued for their timber.

Species
To date, the following species names have been resolved:

 Pterospermum acerifolium (L.) Willd.
 Pterospermum aceroides Wall. ex Kurz
 Pterospermum angustifolium Tardieu
 Pterospermum argenteum Tardieu
 Pterospermum aureum S.K.Ganesan
 Pterospermum blumeanum Korth.
 Pterospermum borneense S.K.Ganesan
 Pterospermum burmannianum Hochr.
 Pterospermum celebicum Miq.
 Pterospermum cinnamomeum Kurz
 Pterospermum cumingii Merr. & Rolfe
 Pterospermum diversifolium Blume
 Pterospermum elmeri Merr.
 Pterospermum elongatum Korth.
 Pterospermum fuscum Korth.
 Pterospermum glabrum S.K.Ganesan
 Pterospermum grande Craib
 Pterospermum grandiflorum Craib
 Pterospermum grewiifolium Pierre
 Pterospermum harmandii Hochr.
 Pterospermum havilandii S.K.Ganesan
 Pterospermum heterophyllum Hance
 Pterospermum jackianum Wall. ex Mast.
 Pterospermum javanicum Jungh.
 Pterospermum kingtungense C.Y.Wu ex H.H.Hsue
 Pterospermum lanceifolium Roxb. ex DC.
 Pterospermum littorale Craib
 Pterospermum longipes Merr.
 Pterospermum megalanthum Merr.
 Pterospermum megalocarpum Tardieu
 Pterospermum mengii P.Wilkie
 Pterospermum menglunense H.H.Hsue
 Pterospermum merrillianum S.K.Ganesan
 Pterospermum mucronatum Tardieu
 Pterospermum niveum S.Vidal
 Pterospermum obliquum Blanco
 Pterospermum obtusifolium Wight
 Pterospermum obtusifolium Wight ex Mast.
 Pterospermum parvifolium Miq.
 Pterospermum pecteniforme Kosterm.
 Pterospermum proteus Burkill
 Pterospermum reticulatum Wight & Arn.
 Pterospermum rubiginosum B.Heyne ex G.Don
 Pterospermum semisagittatum Buch.-Ham. ex Roxb.
 Pterospermum stapfianum Ridl.
 Pterospermum suberifolium (L.) Raeusch.
 Pterospermum subpeltatum C.B.Rob.
 Pterospermum sumatranum Miq.
 Pterospermum thorelii Pierre
 Pterospermum truncatolobatum Gagnep.
 Pterospermum wilkieanum Doweld
 Pterospermum xylocarpum (Gaertn.) Oken
 Pterospermum yunnanense H.H.Hsue
 Pterospermum zollingerianum S.K.Ganesan

Images

References

External links

Images at iNaturalist

 
Malvaceae genera
Indomalayan realm flora